Abaga may refer to:

Places
Abaga Falls, waterfall and ecosystem in Mindanao, Philippines
Abaga (rural locality), several rural localities in the Sakha Republic, Russia
Abaga, a barangay in Libungan Municipality of Cotabato Province, Philippines

People
Abaga Mongols, a southern Mongolian ethnic group
Abaga, alternative name of Abaqa Khan (1234–1282), Mongol ruler of the Persian Ilkhanate
Jesse Abaga (born 1984), born name of Jesse Jagz, Nigerian hip hop artist
Jude Abaga (born 1981), Nigerian rapper better known under his stage name M.I Abaga
Bonifacio Esono Abaga, a participant in 100-meters during the 2009 Jeux de la Francophonie

Other uses
Abaga language, a nearly extinct Kalam language of Papua New Guinea
Abaga, native name of the Mandaic alphabet

See also
Abaga tsentralnaya, a selo in Olyokminsky District of the Sakha Republic, Russia
Abag Banner (Ābāgā Qí), subdivision of Inner Mongolia, China